is a Japanese television drama series that aired on NTV from July 9 to September 24, 2011.

Plot
In this unusual story, Shota Matsuda plays a child welfare official Shirota working at a child consultation center, while Takahashi Katsumi plays a charitable yakuza boss Sabashima. These two lead completely different lives, but one day, their souls are suddenly switched. As a result, Shirota begins dispensing odd advice about the "rules of society" and other things. While his colleagues naturally see this as a problem, the children gradually come to rely on him.

Cast
 Shota Matsuda as Masataka Shirota
 Katsumi Takahashi as Jun Sabashima
 Ryōsuke Makioka as young Jun Sabashima
 Riko Narumi as Sachiko Matsuura
 Ando Kokoha as young Sachiko Matsuura
 Mayuko Kawakita as Eri, Sachiko's friend
 Mao Ueda as Hikari, Sachiko's friend
 Satomi Kobayashi as Mineko Mizumori, the director of the Child Guidance Center
 Hiroki Miyake as Sousuke Nishiwaki, chief child welfare officer
 Miwako Ichikawa as Aki Namba, child welfare officer
 Mahiru Konno as Yasuko Kodama, child welfare officer
 Ai Tamura as Kaede Noguchi, child psychologist
 Kenkichi Watanabe as Jinji Oomori, pediatrician
 Seijun Nobukawa as Yamada, staff member
 5th Reireisha Bafū as Shuzo Iwashihara
 Hakuryu as Kameo Usagida
 Yuki Uchida as Ayumi Sabashima
 Yutaka Matsushige as Daisuke Hyodo
 Kazuma Yamane as Yasu
 Ken Aoki as Ken
 Masaki Suda as Kazuya Akashi

References

External links
  

2011 Japanese television series debuts
2011 Japanese television series endings
Japanese drama television series
Nippon TV dramas
Works about the Yakuza